Golden Venture was a  cargo ship that smuggled 286 undocumented immigrants from China (mostly Fuzhou people from Fujian province) along with 13 crew members that ran aground on the beach at Fort Tilden on the Rockaway peninsula of Queens, New York on June 6, 1993, at around 2 a.m. The ship had sailed from Bangkok, Thailand, stopped in Kenya and rounded the Cape of Good Hope, then headed northwest across the Atlantic Ocean to New York City on its four-month voyage. Ten people drowned in their attempts to flee the ship that had run aground and get to shore in the United States.

The survivors were taken into custody by the Immigration and Naturalization Service (INS) and were held in various prisons throughout the U.S. while they applied for the right of asylum. Roughly 10% were granted asylum after U.S. Representative William Goodling entreated President Bill Clinton; minors were released, while about half the remainder were deported (some being accepted by South American countries). Some remained in immigration prison for years fighting their cases, the majority in York, Pennsylvania. The final 52 persons were released by President Clinton on February 27, 1997, after four years in prison.

This case was an early test of the system of detaining asylum-seekers in prisons, a practice that continues in the U.S., Australia, and the United Kingdom. It was also notable because some detainees created more than 10,000 folk art sculptures or Chinese paper folding, papier-mâché, and recycled materials while in York County Prison; these were later exhibited throughout the U.S. and sold to offset legal costs.

The journey
The immigrants paid $40,000 on average in whole or in part before departing China on foot through Myanmar then to Bangkok where they were kept in a staging house for two months. In February 1993, the ship departed, and on its way stopped by Mombasa, Kenya to pick up passengers left stranded by a previous boat that had run aground there. Rounding the Cape of Good Hope, the ship was caught in a hurricane but survived, and headed toward Boston.

The immigrants held in the cramped hold of the freighter were forced to live on a diet of rice, peanuts, dirty water, and spoiled food as it sailed on its 4-month voyage to New York City. There were beatings by the gang enforcers on board and several incidents of rape.

The ship was supposed to rendezvous with smaller ships before landing. However, this didn't happen due to the gang in charge being arrested around that time. The smugglers on board directed the ship to New York City. Golden Venture ran aground on the beach at Fort Tilden in Rockaway Beach in Queens, New York on June 6, 1993, at around 2 a.m. after a mutiny of sorts by one smuggler who had locked up the captain. Ten people drowned in the city early morning water in their attempts to flee the stranded ship and in their excitement get to shore in the United States.

The survivors, 262 men, 24 women, and 14 children, were taken into custody by the Immigration and Naturalization Service (INS)--six escaped—and were held in various prisons throughout the U.S. while they applied for the right of asylum. Roughly 10 percent were granted asylum after Pennsylvania congressman William Goodling entreated President Bill Clinton; minors were released, while about half the remainder were deported (some being accepted by South American countries). Some remained in immigration prison for years fighting their cases, 119 in York, Pennsylvania in a medium security prison. It was argued that this tactic was a method of isolating the prisoners from lawyers and rights groups. A number of individuals in York volunteered their time as legal aid, and in the last years there was a weekly vigil held outside the prison.

Criminal leaders

Lee Peng Fei, also known as Lee Hsiao Kuang and Char Lee was described at his trial as the 'mastermind' behind Golden Venture. He had not been on board the ship but had ordered the grounding from his Chinatown apartment. The Taiwan citizen was arrested in Thailand and later sentence to 20 years.

One of those behind Golden Venture was a Chinese gang leader named Guo Liang Chi, known mainly by his street name of Ah Kay. He was the leader of the Fuk Ching gang, which up to early 1993, had been the most powerful Asian gang in New York City. A Chinese gangster who smuggled people to other countries, or a snakehead, he was also a cold-blooded gangster who tortured and killed numerous people throughout his career. Kay was arrested in Hong Kong and eventually extradited to the U.S. Federal investigators acknowledged that they were less interested in prosecuting Guo than in hearing what he had to say. After he cooperated with the US government in at least 15 different federal criminal cases over a period of many years, including the prosecution of 35 Chinatown gang members, he eventually received a light sentence.

By contrast, on June 22, 2005 Cheng Chui Ping (known within some communities as "Sister Ping" or "Big Sister Ping") was convicted for smuggling illegal immigrants and for money laundering from this case. Ah Kay testified against her during her May–June 2005 trial. Although Cheng provided cash to buy the aging vessel in Thailand, trial evidence showed that she did not view Golden Ventures voyage as an important business deal, even though the gross take for all involved would have been around $8.5 million – if all of the immigrants aboard had paid or been ransomed by their families. She owned restaurants, a clothing store, real estate in Chinatown, apartments in Hong Kong, and a farm in South Africa. Evidence revealed that her main, multimillion-dollar business was an underground banking network that stretched from New York to Thailand, Singapore, Hong Kong, and China. On March 17, 2006, she was sentenced to the maximum of 35 years in federal prison despite her protests that she was forced to carry out the work by Triad gangs. The federal judge pointed out the inhumane travel conditions forced on the immigrants and her use of gangsters to collect debts and ransoms in justifying the sentence.

Aftermath
Renamed United Caribbean''' and used for a while as a cargo vessel in the Caribbean, the ship was later purchased by Palm Beach County for $60,000 and deliberately sunk August 22, 2000 as an artificial reef in 70 feet of water about one mile off the south coast of Florida near Boca Raton Inlet. The ship, which had been built in 1969, became part of the Palm Beach Artificial Reef Program. This wreck is a scuba diving destination and has now broken into three pieces, courtesy of the 2004 hurricanes Frances and Jeanne.

 In Media 
 A stock photo of passengers from the ship was used a cover photo in a 1994 re-release of Jean Raspail's Camp of the Saints.
 The film Golden Venture (2006) directed by Peter Cohn, a selection of the Tribeca Film Festival.
 A novel Flower Net (1997), By Lisa See.
 Lethal Weapon 4 (1998), a fictional martial arts cop action movie directed by Richard Donner, starring Mel Gibson, Danny Glover, Joe Pesci, Chris Rock and Jet Li (in his first American film), the film uses a vessel running aground with a cargo hold of smuggled Chinese slave laborers to start the action.
 In an episode of Law & Order: Special Victims Unit ("Debt" - Season 6: Episode 2), the detectives speak to an Immigration and Customs Enforcement officer who mentions that Chinese smugglers no longer bring their cargo in container ships since Golden Venture ran aground in 1993.
 A similar scenario based on the Golden Venture story is part of the storyline in GTA San Andreas. In the San Fierro segment of the story the container ship owned by a Vietnamese gang Da Nang Boys is used to smuggle immigrants in the containers. Direct reference to this event is also the name of the leader of this gang (Snakehead)
 Chang-rae Lee's 1995 novel Native Speaker (novel)'' includes scenes based on the Golden Venture.

See also 
 Illegal immigration to the United States
 Pacific Solution
 Fuzhounese Americans

References

External links
 Website for The Snakehead.
 Website for "Golden Venture" documentary.
 Article in "New York Times".

Shipwrecks in the Atlantic Ocean
Shipwrecks of the Florida coast
International maritime incidents
Immigration to the United States
Rockaway, Queens
Maritime incidents in 1993
Refugees in the United States
Human rights in the United States
Triad (organized crime)
Scuttled vessels
1969 ships
Illegal immigration to the United States